Play Fair! was a landmark brochure produced by the San Francisco Order of the Sisters of Perpetual Indulgence produced what was to become a landmark document in the emerging AIDS crisis. Play Fair! was one of the first safer sex material written by and for gay men. One of the authors of the publication was public health nurse and AIDS activist Bobbi Campbell (a.k.a. Sister Florence Nightmare) would go on to appear on the cover of the August 8, 1983, issue of Newsweek.

See also 

 Sisters of Perpetual Indulgence
 How To Have Sex in an Epidemic

References

External links
 More images and some of the content at Gayinthe80s.com
 A copy of the brochure at University of California's Calisphere project

Culture of San Francisco
Gay culture in the United States
History of LGBT civil rights in the United States
LGBT and Catholicism
LGBT culture in San Francisco
LGBT history in San Francisco
1982 non-fiction books
English-language books
History of HIV/AIDS
Sex education
Sex manuals
Sexual health
Sexuality and society
1982 in LGBT history